Samyda villosa is a species of plant in the Salicaceae family. It is endemic to Jamaica.

References

villosa
Vulnerable plants
Endemic flora of Jamaica
Taxonomy articles created by Polbot
Taxa named by Olof Swartz
Taxobox binomials not recognized by IUCN